Michael D. Parker  is a British Methodist minister and military chaplain. He is the current Chaplain-General to His Majesty's Land Forces.

Military career
Educated at the University of Birmingham and the Queen's Foundation, where he trained as Methodist minister, Parker was commissioned into the Royal Army Chaplains' Department in 2000.  He became Deputy Chaplain-General to the Army in September 2020 and Chaplain-General to Her Majesty's Land Forces on 8 May 2022.

References

 

 

 

Living people
British Methodist ministers
Chaplains General to the Forces
Honorary Chaplains to the Queen
Year of birth missing (living people)